Bautista Ezcurra (born 21 April 1995) is an Argentine rugby union player. He currently plays for Rugby ATL of Major League Rugby (MLR).

He was selected for 's sevens squad for the 2016 Summer Olympics.

Ezcurra was named in the  training squad prior to the 2017 Super Rugby season.

References

External links
 
 
 
 

1995 births
Living people
Male rugby sevens players
Argentine rugby union players
Olympic rugby sevens players of Argentina
Argentina international rugby sevens players
Rugby sevens players at the 2016 Summer Olympics
Pan American Games medalists in rugby sevens
Pan American Games silver medalists for Argentina
Rugby sevens players at the 2015 Pan American Games
Argentina international rugby union players
Medalists at the 2015 Pan American Games
Jaguares (Super Rugby) players
Rugby union centres
Rugby ATL players
FC Grenoble players
Rugby union players from Buenos Aires